Betty Davis was an American film editor active primarily in the 1920s. She also appeared in a few uncredited roles as an actress. As an editor, she worked primarily with Australian director J.P. McGowan. Later on, she cut films for Cliff Wheeler and Bernard McEveety.

Selected filmography 

 One Splendid Hour (1929)
 Montmartre Rose (1929)
 Daughters of Desire (1929)
 The Dream Melody (1929)
 The Clean Up (1929)
 Perils of the Rail (1925)
 Cold Nerve (1925)
 Blood and Steel (1925)
 Outwitted (1925)

References

External links

American film editors
American women film editors
Year of birth missing
Year of death missing